The Paraguay national under-16 and under-17 basketball team is a national basketball team of Paraguay, governed by the Confederación Paraguaya de Basquetbol.

It represents the country in international under-16 and under-17 (under age 16 and under age 17) basketball competitions.

It appeared at the 2015 South American U17 Championship.

See also
Paraguay national basketball team
Paraguay national under-19 basketball team
Paraguay women's national under-17 basketball team

References

External links
 Archived records of Paraguay team participations

Basketball teams in Paraguay
Men's national under-17 basketball teams
Basketball